Ching-Yao Fong is a physicist and a Distinguished Professor at the University of California, Davis, and also a published author. He is a Fellow of the American Physical Society, Institute of Physics.

References

University of California, Davis faculty
University of California, Berkeley alumni
University of California, Davis alumni
21st-century Chinese physicists
Fellows of the American Physical Society
Fellows of the Institute of Physics
Year of birth missing (living people)
Living people